The Men's 100 m wheelchair 2 was one of the events held in Athletics at the 1972 Summer Paralympics in Heidelberg.

There were 22 competitors in the heat; 5 made it into the final.

U.S. wheelchair athlete Gary Kerr won the gold medal.

Results

Heats

Final

References 

Wheelchair